James Patrick Crowe (18 May 1909 – 21 May 1979) was an Australian rules footballer who played for Carlton and Collingwood in the Victorian Football League (VFL).

Crowe started his career as a half forward flanker before being moved into defence as a rebound player.
He was a member of Carlton's losing 1932 Grand Final side and in 1936 crossed to Collingwood. In his first year with Collingwood he played in a premiership, occupying a back pocket in the Grand Final.

In 1947 he coached Footscray for a season, with the club finishing ninth out of the twelve clubs.

References

Holmesby, Russell and Main, Jim (2007). The Encyclopedia of AFL Footballers. 7th ed. Melbourne: Bas Publishing.

External links

1909 births
Australian rules footballers from Melbourne
Carlton Football Club players
Collingwood Football Club players
Collingwood Football Club Premiership players
Western Bulldogs coaches
1979 deaths
One-time VFL/AFL Premiership players
People from Carlton, Victoria
Australian rules football coaches